Umbergaon is one of the 182 Legislative Assembly constituencies of Gujarat state in India. It is part of Valsad district and is reserved for candidates belonging to the Scheduled Tribes. It is a part of the Valsad Lok Sabha constituency.

List of segments
This assembly seat represents the following segments

 Umargam Taluka
 Pardi Taluka (Part). Villages – Chanod (CT), Dungra (CT)

Members of Legislative Assembly

Election results

2022

2017

2012

2007

See also
List of constituencies of Gujarat Legislative Assembly
Gujarat Legislative Assembly

References

External links
 

Assembly constituencies of Gujarat
Valsad district